Kohar is a village in the Bhiwani district of the Indian state of Haryana. , the village had 980 households with a total population of 5,242 of which 2,746 were male and 2,496 female.

References

Villages in Bhiwani district